Tachykinin-4 is a protein that in humans is encoded by the TAC4 gene.

This gene is a member of the tachykinin family of neurotransmitter-encoding genes. Tachykinin proteins are cleaved into small, secreted peptides that activate members of a family of receptor proteins. The products of this gene preferentially activate tachykinin receptor 1, and are thought to regulate peripheral endocrine and paracrine functions including blood pressure, the immune system, and endocrine gland secretion. The products of this gene lack a dibasic cleavage site found in other tachykinin proteins. Consequently, the nature of the cleavage products generated in vivo remains to be determined. Multiple transcript variants encoding different isoforms have been found for this gene.

References

Further reading

External links